Arturo Dominici (2 January 1916 – 7 September 1992) was an Italian film, television and voice actor.

Biography 
Born in Palermo, Dominici became best known for his many villainous roles in horror and fantasy films. He is best remembered for his performance as the monstrous Igor Javuto in Mario Bava's Black Sunday (1960) and the evil Eurysteus in the 1958 Steve Reeves epic Hercules.

His filmography includes more than 80 titles, including Antonio Margheriti's Castle of Blood (1964), in which he appeared with Black Sunday star Barbara Steele. Dominici dubbed the voice of Austrian actor Walter Ladengast in the Italian release version of Werner Herzog's  Nosferatu the Vampyre (1979).

Dominici's daughter, Germana, is an Italian stage actress; at the age of 14 she had a small role as a farm girl in Black Sunday.

Death 
Dominici died of cancer on 7 September 1992 and is buried in Rome.

Partial filmography 

 Il principe ribelle (1949)
 Yvonne of the Night (1949) – Un ufficiale di cavalleria
 Cavalcade of Heroes (1950) – Generale Gilletti
 The Last Race (1954) – Doctor Magni
 Red and Black (1955)
 Hercules (1958) – Eurysteus
 Lost Souls (1959) – Franco
 Goliath and the Barbarians (1959) – Svevo
 Caltiki – The Immortal Monster (1959) – Nieto
 Messalina (1960) – Caio Silio
 I piaceri del sabato notte (1960) – Un cliente dell'atelier
 Black Sunday (1960) – Igor Javutich / Javuto
 Revenge of the Barbarians (1960) – Antemius
 Un dollaro di fifa (1960) – Chancellor
 The Thief of Baghdad (1961) – Prince Osman
 The Story of Joseph and His Brethren (1961) – Rekmira, the Minister
 The Trojan Horse (1961) – Achilles
 A Difficult Life (1961) – Ragana (voice, uncredited)
 Charge of the Black Lancers (1962) – Il capo dei Krevires
 The Triumph of Robin Hood (1962) – Baron Elwin, Sheriff of Nottingham
 Seven Seas to Calais (1962) – Don Bernardino de Mendoza, the Spanish Ambassador
 Perseo l'invincibile (1963) – Acrisio
 The Sign of the Coyote (1963) – Judge Clemens
 Hercules and the Masked Rider (1963) – Don Ramiro Suarez
 Hercules vs. Moloch (1963) – Penthius, General of Micenas
 The Betrothed (1964) – Il cardinale Federico Borromeo
 Temple of the White Elephant (1964) – Maharajah
 L'ultima carica (1964)
 Castle of Blood (1964, aka Danza Macabre) – Dr. Carmus
 I due evasi di Sing Sing (1964) – Attanasia
 Hercules and the Tyrants of Babylon (1964)
 Goliath at the Conquest of Damascus (1965) – Kaichev
 Fantômas se déchaîne (1965) – Le professeur canadien
 A Coffin for the Sheriff (1965) – Jerry Krueger
 Giant of the Evil Island (1965) – Don Alvarado
 Zorro il ribelle (1966) – Don Alvarez
 Untamable Angelique (1967) – Mezzo Morte (uncredited)
 Fantabulous Inc. (1967) – Captain Fenninger
 Angelique and the Sultan (1968) – Mezzo Morte (uncredited)
 The Moment to Kill (1968) – Forester
 VIP my Brother Superman (1968) – (voice)
 Dio perdoni la mia pistola (1969) – Judge Collins
  (1969) – La Grêle
 Love Is a Funny Thing (1969) – Le douanier
 Satiricosissimo (1970) – Tigellino
 Investigation of a Citizen Above Suspicion (1970) – Mangani
 Confessions of a Police Captain (1971) – Lawyer Canistraro
 Zorro il cavaliere della vendetta (1971)
 The Adventures of Pinocchio (1972) – The Green Fisherman (voice)
 The Eroticist (1972) – His Excellency
 The Assassin of Rome (1972) – Ing. Jaccarino
 Il caso Pisciotta (1972) – Michele Scauri
 Sinbad and the Caliph of Baghdad (1973) – Visir
 Special Killers (1973) – District Attorney
 Il nano e la strega (1973) – Il Notaio (voice)
 Silent Action (1975) – Chief of police
 Lo sgarbo (1975)
 Free Hand for a Tough Cop (1976) – De Rita
 Tony, l'altra faccia della Torino violenta (1980) – (voice)
 Cappotto di legno (1981) – Ministro Interni
 Il camorrista (1986) – Joe Gambino (voice, uncredited)

References

External links 

1916 births
1992 deaths
Male actors from Palermo
Italian male film actors
Italian male voice actors
20th-century Italian male actors
Deaths from cancer in Lazio
Burials at the Cimitero Flaminio